This article presents a list of the historical events and publications of Australian literature during 2008.

Events
"The Bulletin" magazine publishes its last issue, the first was in 1880
The Australia Council for the Arts announces Christopher Koch and Gerald Murnane as recipients of its 2008 emeritus writers awards
The Australian Federal Government announces funding for a new chair of Australian Literature based at the University of Western Australia
Clunes, Victoria, holds its second Booktown weekend
The first Crime and Justice Festival in held in Melbourne over the weekend of 19–20 July
Australia wins the right to host the 2010 World SF convention in Melbourne
A number of previously unknown Banjo Paterson poems are found in an old cash book dating back to the Boer War
UNESCO names Melbourne as its second City of Literature, after Edinburgh received the first such award in 2004
Caro Llewellyn, a former director of the Sydney Writers' Festival and PEN World Voices Festival in New York, is appointed as director of the new Centre for Books, Writing and Ideas (now called the Wheeler Centre) in Melbourne

Major publications

Literary fiction

 Debra Adelaide – The Household Guide to Dying
 Murray Bail – The Pages
 Geraldine Brooks – People of the Book
 Peter Carey – His Illegal Self
 Luke Davies – God of Speed
 Robert Drewe – The Rip
 Richard Flanagan – Wanting
 Helen Garner – The Spare Room
 Peter Goldsworthy – Everything I Knew
 Kate Grenville – The Lieutenant
 Vicki Hastrich – The Great Arch 
 Wendy James – The Steele Diaries
 Susan Johnson – Life in Seven Mistakes
Toni Jordan – Addition
 Sofie Laguna – One Foot Wrong
 Nam Le – The Boat
 Joan London – The Good Parents
 Louis Nowra – Ice
 Kevin Rabelais – The Landscape of Desire
 Claire Thomas – fugitive blue
 Steve Toltz – A Fraction of the Whole
 Ian Townsend – The Devil's Eye
 Christos Tsiolkas – The Slap
 Tim Winton – Breath
 Arnold Zable – Sea of Many Returns

Children's and Young Adult fiction
 Isobelle Carmody – The Stone Key
 Kate Constable – Always Mackenzie
 Alison Croggon —The Singing
 Mem Fox and Helen Oxenbury – Ten Little Fingers and Ten Little Toes
 Jackie French – A Rose for the Anzac Boys
 Mark Greenwood and Frane Lessac – Simpson and His Donkey
Jack Heath – Money Run
 Simone Howell – Everything Beautiful
 Catherine Jinks – Genius Squad
 Maureen McCarthy – Somebody's Crying
 Melina Marchetta – Finnikin of the Rock
 Sophie Masson – The Case of the Diamond Shadow
 Garth Nix – Superior Saturday
 Penni Russon – The Indigo Girls
 Shaun Tan – Tales from Outer Suburbia
 Lili Wilkinson – The (Not Quite) Perfect Boyfriend
 Sean Williams – Dust Devils

Crime and Mystery
 Peter Corris – Open File
 Leah Giarratano – Voodoo Doll
 Kerry Greenwood – Murder on a Midsummer Night
 Marion Halligan – Murder on the Apricot Coast
 Jarad W. Henry – Blood Sunset
 Katherine Howell – The Darkest Hour
 Barry Maitland – Bright Air
 P.D. Martin – Fan Mail
 Camilla Nelson – Crooked
 Alex Palmer – The Tattooed Man
 Bronwyn Parry – As Darkness Falls
 Kel Robertson – Smoke and Mirrors
 Michael Robotham – Shatter

Romance
Anne Gracie – The Stolen Princess
Stephanie Laurens – The Edge of Desire
 Margaret Leigh – The Heart Divided
 Estelle Pinney – Burnt Sunshine

Science Fiction and Fantasy
 K. A. Bedford – Time Machines Repaired While-U-Wait
 Honey Brown – Red Queen
 Nathan Burrage – Fivefold
 Sara Douglass – The Twisted Citadel
 Greg Egan – Incandescence
 Jennifer Fallon – The Chaos Crystal
 Pamela Freeman – Deep Water
 Alison Goodman – The Two Pearls of Wisdom
 Traci Harding – The Dragon Queens
 Simon Haynes – Hal Spacejock: No Free Lunch
 Margo Lanagan – Tender Morsels
 Fiona McIntosh – Rogue Agent
 Juliet Marillier – Heir to Sevenwaters
 K.E. Mills – The Accidental Sorcerer
 Sean Williams – Earth Ascendent

Drama
 John Doyle – The Pig Iron People
 Tom Holloway – Beyond the Neck
 Joanna Murray-Smith – Ninety

Poetry
See also 2008 in poetry

 Robert Adamson – The Golden Bird: New and Selected Poems, winner of the C.J. Dennis Prize for Poetry in the 2009 Victorian Premier's Literary Awards, shortlisted for the 2009 Age Book of the Year Awards
 Michael Brennan – Unanimous Night
 David Brooks – The Balcony, finalist for the 2008 Kenneth Slessor Prize for Poetry; University of Queensland Press, 
 Elizabeth Hodgson – Skin Painting, winner of the 2007 David Unaipon Award; University of Queensland Press, 
 Sarah Holland-Batt – Aria
 Clive James – Opal Sunset: Selected Poems, 1958–2008
 John Kinsella – Divine Comedy, University of Queensland Press, 
 Anthony Lawrence – Bark, University of Queensland Press, 
 David Malouf – Revolving Days, University of Queensland Press, 
 Peter Rose editor – The Best Australian Poems 2008 Black Inc.,

Non-fiction
 Germaine Greer – On Rage
 Chloe Hooper – The Tall Man

Biographies
 Peter Costello – The Costello Memoirs
 Jacqueline Kent – An Exacting Heart: The Story of Hephzibah Menuhin
 Andrew Riemer – A Family History of Smoking

Awards and honours

Lifetime achievement

Fiction

International

National

Children and Young Adult

National

Crime and Mystery

National

Science Fiction

Non-Fiction

Poetry

Drama

Deaths
 11 January – Nancy Phelan, author (born 1913)
 27 March – Alan Collins, short story writer (born 1928)
 8 April – John Button, politician and author (born 1933)
 26 April – Pamela Bone, journalist and author (born 1940)
 29 April – John Hooker, author (born 1932)
 21 June – Justina Williams, poet (born 1916)
 24 August – Patricia Rolfe, short story writer and critic (born 1920)
 30 September – Eleanor Spence, writer for children (born 1928)
 30 October – Jacob G. Rosenberg, poet and memoirist (born 1922)
 15 November – Ivan Southall, writer for children (born 1921)
 10 December – Dorothy Porter, poet (born 1954)

See also
 2008 in Australia
 2008 in literature
 2008 in poetry
 List of years in literature
 List of years in Australian literature
 List of Australian literary awards

References

Note: all references relating to awards can, or should be, found on the relevant award's page.

Literature
Australian literature by year
21st-century Australian literature
2008 in literature